Anna Murínová (born 14 November 1973) is a Slovak biathlete. She competed at the 1998, 2002 and the 2006 Winter Olympics.

References

1973 births
Living people
Sportspeople from Brezno
Biathletes at the 1998 Winter Olympics
Biathletes at the 2002 Winter Olympics
Biathletes at the 2006 Winter Olympics
Slovak female biathletes
Olympic biathletes of Slovakia
Place of birth missing (living people)
Universiade gold medalists for Slovakia
Universiade bronze medalists for Slovakia
Universiade medalists in biathlon
Competitors at the 1999 Winter Universiade